Antony is a 2018 Indian Tamil-language action drama film written and directed by Kutti Kumar. The film stars Lal, Nishanth and Vaishali in the lead roles. It was released on 1 June 2018.

Cast 

 Lal as George 
Nishanth as Antony 
Vaishali as Maha 
Rekha
Sampath Ram
Cheran Raj
Veppam Raja
Billa Jegan
Rajkanth
Shiva
Rajkumar

Production 
The film was marketed as "India’s first claustrophobic science thriller", with the premise of a man being stuck in a car under the ground. The film was largely shot in Kodaikanal. The film was titled Antony as a tribute to actor Raghuvaran, who immortalised the name in the film Baashha (1995).

Soundtrack 
The soundtrack was composed by debutant, Sivatmikha, who composed songs for the album aged 19. She was approached by producer Vivek after she had promoted her work on Facebook.

The songs of the film were released in a ceremony held in May 2018.

Release and reception 
The film was released on 1 June 2018. A critic from the Times of India gave the film a negative review, though added "the only takeaway for the audience is the somewhat slick cinematography, with a couple of memorable visuals". A reviewer from the Hindustan Times noted "the film with a promising premise loses to bad writing, poor performances by the actors and the sound. The one take away remains the visuals of the film, which are impressive." Further reviews from The New Indian Express and Deccan Chronicle were critical of the film's storyline.

References 

2010s Tamil-language films
2018 films
Indian action drama films
Indian drama films